Cleveland Anthony Sewell, Baron Sewell of Sanderstead,  (born 1959) is a British educational consultant and founder and chair of the educational charity Generating Genius. In July 2020, Sewell was appointed chair of the Commission on Race and Ethnic Disparities tasked with looking into race disparity in the UK. Sewell sits as a life peer in the House of Lords. He has been described as an admirer of the Black conservative scholar Thomas Sowell.

Early life and education 
Tony Sewell was born in Brixton in 1959 and grew up in Penge, Bromley. Sewell's parents arrived in London in the 1950s from Jamaica. During his childhood, Sewell was a member of the Scouts and much of his adolescence was spent in church youth-group activities in and around Sydenham.

In 1981, Sewell graduated from the University of Essex with a BA degree in English Literature. 
He subsequently received a PhD degree in Education from the University of Nottingham in 1995, for his thesis "The relationship between African-Caribbean boys' sub-culture and schooling".

Professional life

Teaching 
After graduating from university, Sewell was employed as a school teacher in Brent. Sewell left this role to teach in Jamaica for two years.

During the late 1980s and early 1990s, he wrote a weekly social commentary column for The Voice. This column was entitled "Live and Kicking" and was intended to be thought provoking. Sewell also had a weekly programme on Choice FM as a talk show host.

After gaining his doctorate in 1995, Sewell worked for many years as a university lecturer at Kingston University and at the University of Leeds.

The Learning Trust 
Sewell helped with the transformation of education in Hackney as part of the team that set up the Learning Trust and the Mossbourne School. This work had national significance given that it was the flagship of the Academy movement.

Commonwealth Secretariat 
Amongst his accomplishments,Dr Sewell has been an international consultant in education for the World Bank and Commonwealth Secretariat

London Schools Excellence Fund 
In 2012, Sewell was appointed by the Mayor of London, Boris Johnson, to chair an inquiry into the challenges faced by primary and secondary schools in London. The inquiry's findings resulted in the government agreeing to provide £26 million to improve teachers' subject knowledge as part of the London Schools Excellence Fund.

Youth Justice Board 
In October 2015, Sewell was appointed as a member of the Youth Justice Board for England and Wales.

Commission on Race and Ethnic Disparities

In July 2020, Sewell was appointed chair of a Government commission tasked with looking into race disparity in the UK. His appointment was criticised by the Muslim Council of Britain, which argued that Sewell was "keen on downplaying race disparities". On 31 March 2021, the Commission on Race and Ethnic Disparities led by Sewell, published its 258-page report, which concluded that while racism exists in the UK, the UK was not institutionally racist. 

After the report's publication, Sewell received extensive online criticism, including from Labour MP Clive Lewis, who tweeted a picture of a Ku Klux Klan member, and from Cambridge post-colonial studies academic Priyamvada Gopal, who sought to deny that Sewell had a real doctorate and then compared him to Joseph Goebbels. Trevor Phillips, the former chairman of the Equality and Human Rights Commission who supported the report, criticised the "white establishment" for not defending Sewell. 

Commentators on race, education, health, and economics, chiefly from the political left, criticised the report's findings for downplaying the extent of racism in Britain. The report was, however, praised by writer and former Social Mobility commmissioner David Goodhart and by The Times, which described it as a "nuanced and practical document". The Runnymede Trust, a race equality think tank, said it was a "let down" by the report and its denial of the existence of institutional racism.

In March 2022, the Inclusive Britain report was published. This was the Government's formal response to the Sewell Report which accepted all the recommendations made by the Sewell Report.

Peerage 
It was announced on 14 October 2022, that as part of the 2022 Special Honours, Sewell would be appointed a life peer. On 16 December 2022, he was created  Baron Sewell of Sanderstead, of Sanderstead in the County of Surrey.

Controversies

Schools 'too feminine for boys'
In 2006, Sewell said that boys were being failed by schools because lessons had become too "feminised". Sewell's comments were criticised by John Dunford, general secretary of the Association of School and College Leaders. Dunford accused Sewell of making "sweeping generalisations" and argued that "schools have put an immense amount of effort into raising boys' achievement in recent years, just as they did for girls in the previous years".

Sexuality comments
In July 2020, The Guardian revealed that in 1990 Sewell published a column in the Voice newspaper in which he said: "We heteros are sick and tired of tortured queens playing hide and seek around their closets. Homosexuals are the greatest queer-bashers around. No other group of people are so preoccupied with making their own sexuality look dirty."

In response to The Guardian's story, Sewell apologised and said that his comments were "wrong and offensive".

Honours and awards 

In the 2016 Birthday Honours, Sewell was appointed a Commander of the Order of the British Empire (CBE) for services to education.

In 2017, Sewell was awarded an Honorary LLD degree from the University of Exeter.

In 2018, Sewell became an Honorary Fellow of University College London.

In 2018, Sewell was awarded an Honorary LLD degree from the University of Essex in 2019.

In 2019, it was announced that Sewell would receive an Honorary Degree from the University of Nottingham, but in 2022 the institution withdrew the degree after Sewell became "the subject of political controversy." Later in 2022, Sewell was awarded an Honorary Doctorate from the University of Buckingham.

In the 2022 Special Honours, Sewell was nominated as a life peer to the House of Lords. On 16 December 2022, he was created Baron Sewell of Sanderstead.

Publications

1980s 
 Garvey's children: the legacy of Marcus Garvey. London: Voice Communications, 1987.

1990s 
 Jamaica Inc.. London: The X Press, 1993.
 Keep on Moving: The Windrush Legacy - The Black Experience in Britain from 1948. London: Voice Enterprises, 1998.
 Black Masculinities and Schooling: How Black Boys Survive Modern Schooling. Stoke-on-Trent: Trentham Books Ltd, 1996.

2000s 
 Generating Genius: Black Boys in Love, Ritual and Schooling. Stoke-on-Trent: Trentham, 2006.

References

}}

1959 births
Living people
People from Brixton
Black British politicians
21st-century English educators
English people of Jamaican descent
Alumni of the University of Essex
Alumni of the University of Nottingham
Commanders of the Order of the British Empire
Black British schoolteachers
Education activists
Conservative Party (UK) life peers
Life peers created by Charles III
People associated with the University of Exeter
People associated with University College London
People associated with the University of Buckingham